The Sula Reef is a deep-water coral reef off the coast of Trøndelag, Norway. It is located on the Sula Ridge, named after the island of Sula. The reef is generated by the coral Lophelia pertusa. Until the discovery of the Røst Reef in 2002, the Sula Reef was the world's largest known Lophelia reef. The Sula Reef is closed to trawling.

References

Landforms of Trøndelag
Coral reefs
Reefs of the Atlantic Ocean
Reefs of Norway